C. Irving Constantine (January 18, 1907 – May 14, 1966) was an American football back who played one season with the Staten Island Stapletons of the National Football League. He played college football at Syracuse University.

Early life
Constantine was born in New York, New York, and was Jewish.  He attended Curtis High School in Staten Island, New York.

College career
Constantine played for the Syracuse Orange from 1928 to 1930. On September 28, 1929, he played in the first night game in the East as Syracuse beat Hobart College by a score of 77-0. He scored three touchdowns in 1929. Constantine broke his shoulder midway through the 1930 season, ending his college career.

Professional career
Constantine played in one game for the Staten Island Stapletons in 1931.

See also
 List of select Jewish football players

References

External links
Just Sports Stats

1907 births
1966 deaths
American football running backs
American football defensive backs
Syracuse Orange football players
Staten Island Stapletons players
Jewish American sportspeople
Players of American football from New York City
20th-century American Jews